Moner Jala is a 2011 Dhallywood action thriller film. The film directed by Malek Afsary and produced by Taposhi Thakur under the banner of Heartbeat Production. It features Shakib Khan and Apu Biswas in the lead roles. It was Shakib Khan's first film of 2011. The film was released internationally as Moner Jala: Most Wanted. The film is an partial remake of 2006 Telugu film Pokiri. Shakib Khan made his debut as a playback singer with the film.

Cast
 Shakib Khan as Chad / Rasel
 Apu Biswas as Chadni
 Misha Sawdagor as Jafar
 Bobita as Chad's mother
 Mizu Ahmed as Abbas, Chadni's father
 Kabila as Majnu, Chad's childhood friend
 Sanko Panja as Jafar's father
 Nagma as Chadni's paternal aunt (special appearance)
 Ilias Kobra as (special appearance)

Crews
 Director — Malek Afsary
 Producer — Taposhi Thakur
 Music — Ali Akram Shuvo
 Written — Kashem Ali Dulal
 Lyrics — Moniruzzaman Monir and Kabir Bokul
 Distributor — Heartbeat Production

Technical details
 Format — 35MM (Color)
 Real — 13;Pans
 Released Year — 2010
 Technical Support — Bangladesh Film Development Corporation (BFDC)

Soundtrack

The film's soundtrack album is composed by Ali Akram Shuvo and one of its song is written by Moniruzzaman Monir and the rest  of songs are written by Kabir Bakul. Seven years after the release of the film, on August 8, 2018, all the songs of the film were released on Anupam Recording Media's YouTube channel. Shakib Khan made his debut as a playback singer in the film with the song "Ami Chokh Tule Takale".

Remakes
The original Telugu film Pokiri, directed by Puri Jagannadh, was remade in several other languages and still found success in the respective regional cinemas. The Tamil version Pokkiri starring Vijay is the first remake. The second one was Wanted, the Hindi version in 2009. Both Pokkiri and Wanted were directed by Prabhu Deva. Prakash Raj reprises his role as the villain in both the remakes. After that, a Kannada version, Porki, directed by M. D. Sridhar, was released on 14 January 2010.

Home Video
The film was released digitally on YouTube on August 24, 2018. , it has been viewed more than 22 million on YouTube.

References

External links

2011 films
2010s romantic action films
Bengali-language Bangladeshi films
Bangladeshi romantic action films
Films scored by Ali Akram Shuvo
Bangladeshi action thriller films
2006 action thriller films
Films about organised crime in Bangladesh
Films directed by Malek Afsari
2010s Bengali-language films
Bangladeshi remakes of Telugu films
Bangladeshi remakes of Indian films